Mohamud Osman Irro (1941– October 26, 1978), also known as Mohamud Sheikh Osman Irro (Moxamud Shiikh Cismaan Cirro) or Mohamoud Sheikh Osman Irro (Maxamuud Sheekh Cismaan Cirro), was a prominent Somali military figure.

Biography
A Colonel in the Somali National Army (SNA), Mohamud Sheikh Osman Irro was among the military officials that were executed by the government on suspicion of involvement in the abortive 1978 coup d'état. He was held to have been the group leader, along with alleged Abdullahi Yusuf Ahmed,  and alleged co-conspirator Abdullahi Ahmed Irro.

Most of the officers  who had helped plot the coup, including the coup leader Colonel Mohamed Osman Irro were tried by court marshal, found guilty and executed. Others, including fellow Frunze Military Academy graduate Colonel Abdullahi Yussuf Ahmed, managed to escape abroad.  Yet others including  Colonel Abdullahi Ahmed Irro and  the Chief of the National Police General  Abdullahi Matukade   court martialled and found not guilty after the military court could not find  evidence of collaboration with Mohamed Osman Irro

See also

 Mohammad Ali Samatar
 Abdullah Mohamed Fadil
 Abdullahi Yusuf Ahmed
 Abdullahi Ahmed Irro
 Yussuf Salhan
 Muse Hassan Sheikh Sayid Abdulle

Notes

1978 deaths
Somalian military leaders
Ethnic Somali people
1930 births